James Barnhill may refer to:
 James Barnhill (referee)
 James Barnhill (artist)